Phanaeus dionysius is a species of dung beetle in the family Scarabaeidae. It is found in region of San Pablo Etla of Oaxaca, Mexico.

Etymology
The specific name dionysius is named after Dionysius II of Syracuse, main character of moral anecdote of the “Sword of Damocles”.

Description
Length of male is 16.5 mm. Body dull shiny black with a faint blue luster. Pronotum with large, flat triangular disk. Slender, long horn strongly curved. Pygidium black. Length of female is 16.3 mm. Body dull shiny black.

References

dionysius
Beetles described in 2018